Eudesmus nicaraguensis is a species of beetle in the family Cerambycidae. It was described by Stephan von Breuning in 1958. It is known from Nicaragua.

References

Onciderini
Beetles described in 1958